Fahad Al-Dossari (born 1 May 1990) is a Saudi Arabian footballer who last played as a winger for Al-Qadisiyah FC.

External links
 

Living people
1990 births
Association football forwards
Saudi Arabian footballers
Al-Shabab FC (Riyadh) players
Ettifaq FC players
Al-Qadsiah FC players
Place of birth missing (living people)
Saudi First Division League players
Saudi Professional League players